James Hanna (born July 14, 1989) is a former American football tight end in the National Football League (NFL) for the Dallas Cowboys. He was drafted in the sixth round (186th overall) of the 2012 NFL Draft. He played college football at the University of Oklahoma.

Early years
Hanna attended Coram Deo Academy where he played six-man football at wide receiver, helping the team achieve a 9-2 and an 11-1 record in his two years there.

After his sophomore season he transferred to Flower Mound High School, where he played the traditional eleven-man football at wide receiver. As a junior, he tallied 20 receptions for 330 yards (16.5-yard average) and 2 touchdowns.

As a senior, he had 53 receptions for 764 yards (14.4-yard average) with 11 touchdowns, 17 carries for 131 yards, 5 punt returns for 145 yards and one touchdown (71 yards) and 6 kickoff returns for 181 yards and one touchdown. He received honorable-mention All-state and Class 5A/Region 1 District VI Offensive MVP honors.

College career
Hanna accepted a football scholarship from the University of Oklahoma, with the intention of being converted into a tight end. As a freshman, he played mostly on special teams. As a sophomore, he appeared in 12 games with 2 starts, catching 6 passes for 48 yards.

As a junior, he was named the starter at tight end, registering 18 receptions for 292 yards (16.2-yard average), 7 touchdowns, one special teams tackle and two kickoff returns for 9 yards. Against Florida State University, he scored his first career touchdown. Against Oklahoma State University, he had career-highs with 4 receptions for 180 yards, including a career-long 76-yard touchdown.

As a senior he started 13 games, posting 27 receptions for 381 yards (14.1-yard average), 2 touchdowns and 3 special teams tackles. He finished his college career ranked eighth in school history for tight ends with 52 receptions for 720 yards.

Professional career

His position in the 2012 NFL Draft was greatly improved by his NFL Scouting Combine performance, displaying great speed (4.49 seconds in the 40-yard dash) and athleticism, topping all tight ends in 5 different categories.

Hanna was selected by the Dallas Cowboys in the sixth round (186th overall) of the 2012 NFL Draft, to improve the depth at the tight end position after losing Martellus Bennett in free agency. As a rookie, he was given the number worn by Jay Novacek and became a core special teams player, finishing fifth on the team with 10 tackles.

His progress in the offense was slow until the 2014 season, when he found a role as a point-of-attack blocker and helped DeMarco Murray become the NFL leading rusher. He also finished second on the team with 12 special teams tackles.

In 2015, he sprained the medial collateral ligament in his left knee during the first preseason game against the San Diego Chargers, slowing him down in training camp. After playing in the season opener, the injury forced him to miss the second game against the Philadelphia Eagles and to have surgery on September 21. He was declared inactive for the fifth game against the New England Patriots. During the season, he was able to play through knee and ankle injuries, while continuing to improve his run blocking and help Darren McFadden rush for 1,000 yards for just the second time in his career.

On March 11, 2016, he signed a three-year contract as a free agent to remain with the Cowboys. He was diagnosed with a bone bruise in his right knee at the start of training camp, that required him to have surgery and be placed on the physical unable to perform list. The injury was more serious than expected and he had a second surgery in November, effectively ending his season without any games played.

On September 1, 2017, Hanna secured the backup tight end position on the depth chart ahead of Geoff Swaim. He appeared in 16 games (8 starts) as the blocking tight end and recorded his first career touchdown reception against the Los Angeles Rams.

On April 20, 2018, Hanna announced his retirement from the NFL after dealing with knee issues the previous two seasons. He finished his career with 37 receptions for 374 yards (10.1-yard average) and one touchdown.

NFL statistics

References

External links
 
 Oklahoma Sooners bio

1989 births
Living people
American football tight ends
Dallas Cowboys players
Oklahoma Sooners football players
People from Flower Mound, Texas
Players of American football from Texas
Sportspeople from the Dallas–Fort Worth metroplex